Agastache wrightii is a plant species in the genus Agastache, family Lamiaceae. It is native to the US states of Arizona and New Mexico, as well as the Sierra Madre Occidental along the boundary between the Mexican states of Chihuahua and Sonora. Common name is Sonoran giant hyssop.

This is an herb up to 2 m tall, with blue flowers.

References

wrightii
Flora of Mexico
Flora of Chihuahua (state)
Flora of Arizona
Flora of New Mexico
Flora of Sonora